José Antonio Serrano Ramos (born 6 August 1984), known as José Antonio, is a Spanish footballer who plays for fourth-tier CDA Navalcarnero, as of the 2019–20 season, as a left back.

Club career
José Antonio was born in Madrid, and represented Getafe CF as a youth. After making his senior debut with the reserves in 2003 in the regional leagues, he made his first team – and La Liga – debut on 29 August 2004, starting and scoring his team's only in a 1–3 away loss against Real Zaragoza.

José Antonio only left Geta in 2008, and subsequently joined CD Toledo in Tercera División. He subsequently resumed his career in Segunda División B but also in the fourth division in the following seasons, representing AD Colmenar Viejo, Marbella FC, CDA Navalcarnero (two stints), CD Puerta Bonita and CF Rayo Majadahonda.

References

External links

1984 births
Living people
Footballers from Madrid
Spanish footballers
Association football defenders
La Liga players
Segunda División B players
Tercera División players
Getafe CF B players
Getafe CF footballers
CD Toledo players
Marbella FC players
CF Rayo Majadahonda players
CDA Navalcarnero players